Asset management companies in China came into being in 1998. The founding of commercial Asset management companies (AMC) established by the Ministry of Finance tasked with professionally managing third-party assets was a major landmark in the development of China's financial system. It marks a transition in Chinese regulation away from an unregulated environment toward a system where specialist companies started to operate according to a defined set of standards and regulations. The Chinese government created 10 AMCs in China. 4 as bad banks, one for each of the four commercial state-owned banks. and 6 Fund management companies. As of 2018 there are over 130 asset management companies in china, with a combined 2 billion USD in assets under management.

The original asset management companies include:
 China Great Wall Asset Management - for the Agricultural Bank of China
 China Orient Asset Management - for the Bank of China
 China Huarong Asset Management - for the Industrial and Commercial Bank of China
 China Cinda Asset Management - for the China Construction Bank
 Bosera Asset Management - Fund management company
 China Asset Management - Fund management company

Other private equity firm and trustee companies also existed in China, such as:
 CITIC Group and its subsidiary CITIC Trust, formerly China International Trust Investment Corporation
 Ping An Trust of Ping An Group

See also
China Asset Management Co., Ltd.
Chinese financial system
Insurance industry in China
Economy of China
State-owned enterprise

References

External links
The opportunity in asset management in China

Lists of companies of China
Asset management